"One Night As I Lay On My Bed" is a traditional folksong.

Synopsis

A young woman lies in bed thinking of her lover. She hears him tapping at her window, asking to be allowed in. She warns him that her parents will hear them. He replies that they are sound asleep. She lets him in.

Commentary
The theme of the song is so common in the UK, USA and Canada that the phrase "Night-visiting song" has been coined to cover all possible versions. This category is so huge that even minor variations are classed as being a different song. "Cold Haily Windy Night" has the same story but takes place in the rain. It is Roud 135. "Blow The Candle Out" has the same story but has the discussion taking place inside the bed rather than outside the house. It is classed as Roud 368. In addition there is "The Grey Cock" (Child 248, Roud 179) where the couple are woken by a cock, and "I'm A Rover" (Roud 3135) where alcohol is a significant element.

Historical background

A fragment of a song in Johnson's "Scots Musical Museum" inspired Robert Burns to write
a fuller version, published in 1803.

Cultural relationships
Romeo and Juliet is the best-known story to contain the theme of a secret sexual liaison.

Standard references

 Roud 672
 Laws M4

Broadsides

"Drowsy sleeper" in Bodleian 1817.

Textual variants

The song exists under the titles:
 Go From My Window
 The Drowsy Sleeper
 Farewell to Bonny Galaway
 Katie Dear
 Darling Corey
The tune for "Darlin' Corey" (Roud 5723) is similar to one of the tunes for "Drowsy Sleeper". Most versions concern a hard-drinking woman who is fond of moonshine, and avoids hard work. One version, as sung by The Kingston Trio, has the chorus "Wake up, wake up, darlin' Corey. What makes you sleep so sound? The revenue officer's a comin', gonna tear your still house down." This might possibly be a relic of its origins in the song "Who's that Knocking on My Window". It could be considered as a female version of "I'm A Rover".

Literature

The opening paragraphs of Emily Brontë's Wuthering Heights might have been inspired by the song, but in this case the lover is a ghost.

Television and movie references
Sung by Dick Dewey (James Murray) and the rest of the church choir to Fancy Day (Keeley Hawes) in Nicholas Laughland's adaptation of Thomas Hardy's "Under the Greenwood Tree", 2005.

Recordings

Musical variants
 "Silver Dagger", made famous by Joan Baez, is a related song. (Baez also recorded "Go 'way From My Window")
 "The Grey Cock" is another night-visiting song.

References

 Columbia State University

External links
Bluegrass Messengers

English folk songs
Joan Baez songs